The Capital City Weekly, or CCW as it is informally known, is a free regional weekly newspaper in Juneau — Alaska's capital. It is the largest distributed community paper in Southeast Alaska. It focuses on feature news stories about Southeast Alaska with nearly all of its content produced by local writers.

References

External links
 

1980 establishments in Alaska
Mass media in Juneau, Alaska
Morris Publishing Group
Newspapers published in Alaska
Publications established in 1980